Ult Tagdyry is a Kazakh nationalist political movement that was formed on 28 July 2005. It was known for having Amirjan Qosanov being its nominee in the 2019 presidential election where he won around 16% of the popular vote, making it the most votes that a non-incumbent presidential candidate has received in Kazakhstan's history. It also criticized the proposal to extend Nazarbayev's term to 2020.

References

Political advocacy groups in Kazakhstan
Political movements in Kazakhstan
Organizations established in 2005
2005 establishments in Kazakhstan